2014 Assam violence may refer to:

 May 2014 Assam violence, attacks occurred on the Bengali speaking Muslims in Assam between the 1st and the 3rd May
 December 2014 Assam violence, attacks by militants resulted in deaths of 75 local tribal people in Assam in December